Naqduz (also Romanized as Naqdūz; also known as Nīāz) is a village in, and serves as the capital of, Naqduz Rural District of Fandoqlu District, Ahar County, East Azerbaijan province, Iran. At the 2006 census, its population was 418 in 90 households. The following census in 2011 counted 485 people in 130 households. The latest census in 2016 showed a population of 459 people in 140 households.

References 

Ahar County

Populated places in East Azerbaijan Province

Populated places in Ahar County